is a Japanese dentist, amateur astronomer and a discoverer of minor planets.

According to the Minor Planet Center, he is credited with the discovery of 148 asteroids between 1991 and 1997, 15 of which were co-discoveries with Osamu Muramatsu. As of 2016, he ranks 81st place just behind Tamara Mikhailovna Smirnova in the MPC's asteroid discovery listings.

List of discovered minor planets

References

External links 
 Minor Planet Discoverers (Alphabetically)

1957 births
Discoverers of asteroids

People from Mitaka, Tokyo
20th-century Japanese astronomers
Living people
Japanese dentists